Poteria fasciatum is a species of tropical land snail with gills and an operculum, a terrestrial gastropod mollusk in the family Neocyclotidae.

References

Neocyclotidae